"Dream Walkin'" is a song co-written and performed by American country music artist Toby Keith.  It was released in January 1998 as the third single from his album of the same name.  It peaked at number 5 in the United States, and number 3 in Canada.  Keith wrote the song with Chuck Cannon.

Content
The song is about a man who dreams in many situations, such as leaving a yellow rose and a longneck bottle, and a woman stealing the man's sunglasses and an old jean jacket.

Critical reception 
Deborah Evans Price, of Billboard magazine reviewed the song favorably, saying that it "boasts a strong melody boasted by tasty guitar licks." She goes on to call the lyrics "very visual" and say that Keith "delivers a winning performance with his full-throated country baritone exploring every lyrical nuance."

Music video
The music video was directed by Michael Salomon, and premiered on CMT on January 30, 1998, when CMT named it a "Hot Shot". It features Keith in a dream fantasy world. Throughout the video, Keith was lying in bed singing the song, and showing him going throughout his dreams. Keith was waking up the whole time throughout the video.

Chart positions
"Dream Walkin'" debuted at number 75 on the Hot Country Singles & Tracks chart for the week of January 31, 1998.

Year-end charts

References

1997 songs
1998 singles
Toby Keith songs
Songs written by Chuck Cannon
Songs written by Toby Keith
Song recordings produced by James Stroud
Music videos directed by Michael Salomon
Mercury Nashville singles